Ellen Gould White (née Harmon; November 26, 1827 – July 16, 1915) was an American author and co-founder of the Seventh-day Adventist Church. Along with other Adventist leaders such as Joseph Bates and her husband James White, she was instrumental within a small group of early Adventists who formed what became known as the Seventh-day Adventist Church. White is considered a leading figure in American vegetarian history. Smithsonian named her among the "100 Most Significant Americans of All Time".

White claimed to have received over 2,000 visions and dreams from God in public and private meetings throughout her life, which were witnessed by Adventist pioneers and the general public. She verbally described and published for public consumption the content of each vision. The Adventist pioneers viewed these experiences as the Biblical gift of prophecy as outlined in Revelation 12:17 and Revelation 19:10, which describe the testimony of Jesus as the "spirit of prophecy". Her Conflict of the Ages series of writings endeavor to showcase the hand of God in Biblical history and in church history. This cosmic conflict, referred to by Seventh-day Adventist theologians as the "Great Controversy theme", became foundational to the development of Seventh-day Adventist theology. Her book on successful Christian living, Steps to Christ, has been published in more than 140 languages. The book Child Guidance, a compilation of her writings about child care, training and education, has been used as the foundation for the Seventh-day Adventist school system.

White was considered a controversial figure by her critics, and much of the controversy centered on her reports of visionary experiences and on the use of other sources in her writings. Historian Randall Balmer has described White as "one of the more important and colorful figures in the history of American religion". Walter Martin described her as "one of the most fascinating and controversial personages ever to appear upon the horizon of religious history". Arthur L. White, her grandson and biographer, writes that Ellen G. White is the most translated female non-fiction author in the history of literature, as well as the most translated American non-fiction author of either gender. Her writings covered a broad range of subjects, including religion, social relationships, prophecy, publishing, nutrition, creationism, agriculture, theology, evangelism, Christian lifestyle, education, and health. She advocated vegetarianism. She promoted and has been instrumental in the establishment of schools and medical centers all over the world, with the most renowned being Andrews University in Michigan and the Loma Linda University and Medical Center in California.

During her lifetime she wrote more than 5,000 periodical articles and 40 books.  more than 200 White titles are available in English, including compilations from her 100,000 pages of manuscript published by the Ellen G. White Estate, which are accessible at the Adventist Book Center. Her most notable books are Steps to Christ, The Desire of Ages and The Great Controversy.

Personal life

Early life

Ellen and her twin sister Elizabeth were born November 26, 1827, to Robert and Eunice Harmon at a home on State Route 114 in Gorham, Maine. She was the seventh of eight children. Robert was a farmer who also made hats using mercuric nitrate.

Charles E. Dudley Sr., in his book The Genealogy of Ellen Gould Harmon White: The Prophetess of the Seventh-day Adventist Church, and the Story of the Growth and Development of the Seventh-day Adventist Denomination as It Relates to African-Americans claims that Ellen White had an African-American ancestry. In March 2000, the Ellen G. White Estate commissioned Roger D. Joslyn, a professional genealogist, to research Ellen G. White's ancestry. Joslyn concluded that she was of Anglo-Saxon origin.

At the age of nine, White was hit in the face with a stone. This occurred while she was living in Portland, Maine, and probably attending the Brackett Street School. This, she said, started her conversion: "This misfortune, which for a time seemed so bitter and was so hard to bear, has proved to be a blessing in disguise. The cruel blow which blighted the joys of earth, was the means of turning my eyes to heaven. I might never had known Jesus Christ, had not the sorrow that clouded my early years led me to seek comfort in him". A few years after her injury, Ellen, with her parents, attended a Methodist camp meeting at Buxton, Maine; and there, at the age of 12, a breakthrough occurred in which she had a conversion experience and felt at peace.

Millerite movement

In 1840, at age 12, her family became involved with the Millerite movement. As she attended William Miller's lectures, she felt guilty for her sins and was filled with terror about being eternally lost. She describes herself as spending nights in tears and prayer and being in this condition for several months. On June 26, 1842, she was baptized by John Hobart in Casco Bay in Portland, Maine, and eagerly awaited Jesus to come again. In her later years, she referred to this as the happiest time of her life. Her family's involvement with Millerism caused them to be disfellowshipped by the local Methodist church.

Marriage and family

Sometime in 1845 Ellen Harmon came in contact with her future husband James Springer White, a Millerite who became convinced that her visions were genuine. During the winter of 1845, the two visited Millerite believers in Maine, including an eventful stop in Atkinson for a farmhouse meeting led by Israel Dammon. A year later James proposed and they were married by a justice of the peace in Portland, Maine, on August 30, 1846. James later wrote:

We were married August 30, 1846, and from that hour to the present she has been my crown of rejoicing ... It has been in the good providence of God that both of us had enjoyed a deep experience in the Advent movement ... This experience was now needed as we should join our forces and, united, labor extensively from the Atlantic Ocean to the Pacific ...

The Whites had four sons: Henry Nichols, James Edson (known as Edson), William Clarence (known as Willie or W. C.), and John Herbert. Only Edson and William lived to adulthood. John Herbert died of erysipelas at the age of two months, and Henry died of pneumonia at the age of 16 [White Estate Biography] in 1863.

Final years and death

White spent the final years of her life in Elmshaven, her home in Saint Helena, California after the death of her husband James White in 1881. During her final years she traveled less frequently as she concentrated upon writing her last works for the church. She died on July 16, 1915, at her home in Elmshaven, which is now an Adventist Historical Site. After three funerals, she was buried with her husband James White in Oak Hill Cemetery, Battle Creek, Michigan.

Ministry

Visions
From 1844 to 1863 White allegedly experienced between 100 and 200 visions, typically in public places and meeting halls. She experienced her first vision soon after the Millerite Great Disappointment of 1844. She said she had one that led to the writing of The Great Controversy at an Ohio funeral service held on a Sunday afternoon in March 1858, in the Lovett's Grove (now Bowling Green, Ohio) public school. This was an alleged vision of the ages-long conflict between Christ and his angels and Satan and his angels.

Physical phenomena during visions
J. N. Loughborough, who had seen White in vision 50 times since 1852, and her husband, James White, listed several physical characteristics that marked the visions:
"In passing into vision, she gives three enrapturing shouts of "Glory!" which echo and re-echo, the second, and especially the third, fainter but more thrilling than the first, the voice resembling that of one quite a distance from you, and just going out of hearing." 
For a few moments she would swoon, having no strength.  Then she would be instantly filled with superhuman strength, sometimes rising to her feet and walking about the room. She frequently moved hands, arms, and head in gestures that were free and graceful. But to whatever position she moved a hand or arm, it could not be hindered nor controlled by even the strongest person.  In 1845, she held her parents' 18.5 pound family Bible in her outstretched left hand for half an hour.  She weighed 80 pounds at the time. 
She did not breathe during the entire period of a vision that ranged from fifteen minutes to three hours.  Yet, her pulse beat regularly and her countenance remained pleasant as in the natural state.
Her eyes were always open without blinking; her head was raised, looking upward with a pleasant expression as if staring intently at some distant object.  Several physicians, at different times, conducted tests to check her lack of breathing and other physical phenomena.
She was utterly unconscious of everything transpiring around her, and viewed herself as removed from this world, and in the presence of heavenly beings.
When she came out of vision, all seemed total darkness whether in the day time or a well-lighted room at night.  She would exclaim with a long-drawn sigh, as she took her first natural breath, "D-a-r-k." She was then limp and strengthless.

Martha Amadon added: "There was never an excitement among those present during a vision; nothing caused fear. It was a solemn, quiet scene."

First vision
In December 1844, White experienced her first vision during a prayer meeting at the home of Mrs. Haines at 60 Ocean Street in South Portland, Maine, which later became the Griffin Club. The building was torn down in 2018. 

At this time I visited one of our Advent sisters, and in the morning we bowed around the family altar. It was not an exciting occasion, and there were but five of us present, all females. While praying, the power of God came upon me as I never had felt it before, and I was wrapt up in a vision of God's glory, and seemed to be rising higher and higher from the earth and was shown something of the travels of the Advent people to the Holy City ...

In this vision the "Advent people" were traveling a high and dangerous path towards the city of New Jerusalem [heaven]. Their path was lit from behind by "a bright (light) [...] which an angel told me was the midnight cry." Some of the travelers grew weary and were encouraged by Jesus; others denied the light, the light behind them went out, and they fell "off the path into the dark and wicked world below." The vision continued with a portrayal of Christ's second coming, following which the Advent people entered the New Jerusalem; and ended with her returning to earth feeling lonely, desolate and longing for that "better world."
 
As Godfrey T. Anderson said, "In effect, the vision assured the Advent believers of eventual triumph despite the immediate despair into which they had plunged."

Second and third visions
In February 1845, White allegedly experienced her second vision in Exeter, Maine known as the "Bridegroom" vision. Together with the third vision about the new earth, the visions "gave continued meaning to the October 1844 experience and supported the developing sanctuary rationale. Additionally they played an important role in countering the spiritualizing views of many fanatical Adventists by portraying the Father and Jesus as literal beings and heaven as a physical place."

Otsego vision 
On June 6, 1863 in Otsego, Michigan she experienced a vision about health and disease. The vision showed her that vegetarian food, as was described in Genesis 1:29, was the proper food for humankind. However, White enjoyed eating meat and had a hard time with the message because of her extensive travels during the 19th century and the lack of vegetarian food. Vegetarianism was popular in Portland, Maine during her childhood, but she enjoyed meat. She became committed herself to vegetarianism in January 1894 when she was at the Brighton camp meeting near Melbourne, Australia.

Public testimony
Fearing people would not accept her testimony, White did not initially share her visions with the wider Millerite community. In a meeting at her parents' home when she received what she regarded as confirmation of her ministry:

While praying, the thick darkness that had enveloped me was scattered, a bright light, like a ball of fire, came towards me, and as it fell upon me, my strength was taken away. I seemed to be in the presence of Jesus and the angels. Again it was repeated, 'Make known to others what I have revealed to you.'

Soon White was giving her testimony in public meetings – some of which she arranged herself – and in her regular Methodist class meetings in private homes.

I arranged meetings with my young friends, some of whom were considerably older than myself, and a few were married persons. A number of them were vain and thoughtless; my experience sounded to them like an idle tale, and they did not heed my entreaties. But I determined that my efforts should never cease till these dear souls, for whom I had so great an interest, yielded to God. Several entire nights were spent by me in earnest prayer for those whom I had sought out and brought together for the purpose of laboring and praying with them.

News of her visions spread and White was soon traveling and speaking to groups of Millerite followers in Maine and the surrounding area. Her visions were not publicized further afield until January 24, 1846, when her account of the first vision: "Letter From Sister Harmon" was published in the Day Star, a Millerite paper published in Cincinnati, Ohio by Enoch Jacobs. White had written to Jacobs to encourage him and although she stated the letter was not written for publication, Jacobs printed it anyway. Through the next few years it was republished in various forms and is included as part of her first book, Christian Experience and Views, published in 1851.

Two Millerites claimed to have had visions prior to White – William Ellis Foy (1818–1893), and Hazen Foss (1818?–1893), White's brother-in-law. Adventists believe the prophetic gift offered to these two men was passed on to White when they rejected it.

Middle life

White described the vision experience as involving a bright light which would surround her and she felt herself in the presence of Jesus or angels who would show her events (historical and future) and places (on earth, in heaven, or other planets).
The transcriptions of White's visions generally contain theology, prophecy, or personal counsels to individuals or to Adventist leaders. One of the best examples of her personal counsels is found in a 9-volume series of books entitled Testimonies for the Church, that contains edited testimonies published for the general edification of the church. The spoken and written versions of her visions played a significant part in establishing and shaping the organizational structure of the emerging Adventist Church. Her visions and writings continue to be used by church leaders in developing the church's policies and for devotional reading.

On March 14, 1858, at Lovett's Grove, near Bowling Green, Ohio, White received a vision while attending a funeral service. On that day James White wrote that "God manifested His power in a wonderful manner" adding that "several had decided to keep the Lord's Sabbath and go with the people of God." In writing about the vision, she stated that she received practical instruction for church members, and more significantly, a cosmic sweep of the conflict "between Christ and His angels, and Satan and his angels." Ellen White would expand upon this great controversy theme which would eventually culminate in the Conflict of the Ages series.

Personality and public persona

White was seen as a powerful and sought-after preacher. While she has been perceived as having a strict and serious personality, perhaps due to her lifestyle standards, numerous sources describe her as a friendly person.

Major teachings

Theology
 Christ-centered salvation by grace
 The Great Controversy theme
 Obedience to revealed truth a sign of genuine faith
Jerry Moon argues that White taught assurance of salvation.
Arthur Patrick believes that White was evangelical, in that she had high regard for the Bible, saw the cross as central, supported righteousness by faith, believed in Christian activism, and sought to restore New Testament Christianity.

Ellen White avoided using the word "Trinity", "and her husband stated categorically that her visions did not support the Trinitarian creed." Her theology did not include a doctrine of the Trinity (generally speaking, she lacked doctrine, since she was a preacher/orator rather than an academic theologian). In her own opinion, Jesus did not begin as equal to God the Father but was at a certain moment promoted to equality with the Father, which triggered Lucifer's rebellion (as explained in her book Spirit of Prophecy).

It has however been demonstrated, by Jerry Moon in The Adventist Trinity Debate, that although her earlier visions and writings do not clearly reveal the Three Persons of the Godhead, her later works strongly bring out the teaching of "the Third Person of the Godhead."

Education
White's earliest essays on education appeared in the 1872 autumn editions of the Health Reformer.
In her first essay she stated that working with youthful minds was the most delicate of tasks. The manner of instruction should be varied. This would make it possible for the "high and noble powers of the mind" to have a chance to develop. To be qualified to educate the youth (she wrote), parents and teachers must have self-control, gentleness and love.

White's idea of creating a Christian educational system and its importance in society is detailed in her writings Christian Education (1893, 1894) and Education (1903).

Health reform

White expounded greatly on the subjects of health, healthy eating and a vegetarian diet. In her book Counsels on Diet & Foods, she gives advice on the right foods and on moderation. She also warns against the use of tobacco, which was medically accepted in her day. Her views are expressed in the writings Healthful Living (1897, 1898) and The Health Food Ministry (1970) and The Ministry of Healing (1905). White wrote in The Ministry of Healing: ""Grains, fruits, nuts, and vegetables constitute the diet chosen for us by our Creator." 

She is the founder of many health sanitariums, the most famous of which are the Battle Creek Sanitarium and the Loma Linda Sanitarium, that is now name of the Loma Linda University Medical Center. She hired American physician, inventor, and businessman John Harvey Kellogg. Her work for health reform and emphasis on healthy lifestyle is seen as the cause of the city of Loma Linda being named by researcher Dan Buettner a Blue Zone where residents live for longer lives than the average lifespan. The health reform prophecies she delivered have become church doctrine to glorify God but does not make vegetarianism a requirement for salvation. The most vegetarian church fellowship is in North America where over half of Adventists in North American are vegetarian or vegan. 

Her health reform writing focused on human health but her statements also included compassion towards animals, which was unusual for her time.

Major writings

White's books include:
 Patriarchs and Prophets (book, 1890), describing Biblical History from creation to Israel's King David.
 Prophets and Kings (book, 1917), describing Biblical History from King Solomon until Israel returned from exile.
 The Desire of Ages (book, 1898), comprehensive volume on the life of Jesus Christ.
 The Acts of the Apostles (book, 1911) detailing the rise of the early Christian church in the first century.
 The Great Controversy, describing the history of sin from beginning to end.
 Steps to Christ (1892), a classic, concise (evangelical) treatment of personal devotional topics.
 Christ's Object Lessons (1900), about the parables of Jesus.
 Education (1903), principles of Christian education
 The Ministry of Healing (1905), instructions on healthy living and the care of others.
 Thoughts from the Mount of Blessing (1896), about Christ's Sermon on the Mount.

A survey conducted in 2016 found that White was the 11th most-read author in Brazil.

Historic legacy

According to one evangelical author, "No Christian leader or theologian has exerted as great an influence on a particular denomination as Ellen White has on Adventism."  Additional authors have stated "Ellen G. White has undoubtedly been the most influential Seventh-day Adventist in the history of the church." She is frequently mentioned in non-Adventist media, with one example being Parade magazine in 2022 listing a quote from White among its list of the 100 best love quotes.

Ellen G. White Estate
The Ellen G. White Estate, Inc., was formed as a result of White's will.  It consists of a self-perpetuating board and a staff which includes a secretary (now known as the director), several associates, and a support staff. The main headquarters is at the Seventh-day Adventist General Conference headquarters in Silver Spring, Maryland. Branch Offices are located at Andrews University, Loma Linda University, and Oakwood University. There are 15 additional research centers located throughout the 13 remaining divisions of the world church. The mission of the White Estate is to circulate Ellen White's writings, translate them, and provide resources for helping to better understand her life and ministry. At the Toronto General Conference Session (2000) the world church expanded the mission of the White Estate to include a responsibility for promoting Adventist history for the entire denomination.

Adventist historic sites
Several of White's homes are historic sites. The first home that she and her husband owned is now part of the Historic Adventist Village in Battle Creek, Michigan. Her other homes are privately owned with the exception of her home in Cooranbong, Australia, which she named "Sunnyside", and her last home in Saint Helena, California, which she named "Elmshaven". These latter two homes are owned by the Seventh-day Adventist Church and the "Elmshaven" home is also a National Historic Landmark.

Avondale College
White inspired and guided the foundation of Avondale College, Cooranbong, leaving an educational legacy from her time in Australia. Avondale College is the main Seventh-day Adventist tertiary institution in the South-Pacific Division. In 2021, the restored White house of Sunnyside was reopened to the public. The home has architectural elements of New England adapted for Australia.

Other sites 
In Florence, Italy, a street is named after White. The via Ellen Gould White leads to the Adventist Institute "Villa Aurora" at the Viale del Pergolino.

Vegetarian food 
White had a major influence on the development of vegetarian foods and vegetarian food product companies. In the U.S., these included granola, Kellogg's corn flakes, Post cereals, Soyalac soymilk, Worthington Foods, La Loma Foods, and Morningstar Farms. In 2022, the New York Conference of Seventh-day Adventists had a list of 33 Adventist-affiliated vegetarian restaurants, most that were located inside the United States of America including six that serve in Texas. In Kingston, Jamaica, the three Maranatha health food stores and one restaurant are based on the health teachings of White.

In 2021, an opinion column in Australian beef industry publication Beef Central was critical of the influence of the Seventh-day Adventist church in shaping national food policy traced to White and the 1897 founding of the Sanitarium Health and Wellbeing Company, which manufactures Veggie Delights plant-based meats. In 2022, journalist Avery Yale Kamila said that White's "profound and lasting influence on vegetarian food in the United States continues today."

Biographical writings
Ellen White wrote her own biography first published in 1851 as A Sketch of the Christian Experience and Views of Ellen G. White. This she expanded in 1880 as Life Sketches of James White and Ellen G. White which was later expanded again by White and several authors who covered the remainder of her life, published in 1915 it remains in print as Life Sketches of Ellen G. White (abbreviated as LS).

The most comprehensive biography of White is an extensive six-volume work called "Ellen G. White: A Biography" written by her grandson, Arthur L. White.  Thousands of articles and books have been written about various aspects of Ellen G. White's life and ministry. A large number of these can be found in the libraries at Loma Linda University and Andrews University, the two primary Seventh-day Adventist institutions with major research collections about Adventism. An "Encyclopedia of Ellen G. White" is being produced by two faculty at Andrews University: Jerry Moon, chair of the church history department, and Denis Fortin, dean of the Seventh-day Adventist Theological Seminary.

Theatre

Red Books: Our Search for Ellen White is a play about White, a co-founder of the Seventh-day Adventist Church, and the various perceptions of her throughout the history of the church. It was produced by the Dramatic Arts Society of Pacific Union College in California. It was based on interviews collected from over 200 individuals. The title derives from White's books, which were traditionally bound with a red cover.

Film
Produced by the Seventh-Day Adventist church in 2016, the movie Tell the World chronicles the life of Ellen G. White, "Her guidance and advice, obtained through Bible studies, as well as dreams and visions revealed by God, guided the steps of the Church in becoming a worldwide movement of compassion in the areas of health, education, community development and disaster relief."

Examination of the prophetic value of her writings

Most Adventists believe White's writings are inspired and continue to have relevance for the church today. Because of criticism from the evangelical community, in the 1940s and 1950s church leaders such as LeRoy Edwin Froom and Roy Allan Anderson attempted to help evangelicals understand Seventh-day Adventists better by engaging in extended dialogue that resulted in the publication of Questions on Doctrine (1956) that explained Adventist beliefs in evangelical language.

Evangelical Walter Martin of the countercult Christian Research Institute "rejected White's prophetic claims", yet saw her "as a genuine Christian believer", unlike her contemporaries Joseph Smith, Mary Baker Eddy, and Charles Taze Russell. Kenneth Samples, a successor of Martin in his interaction with Adventism, also denies White's prophetic claims yet "believe[s] she, at minimum, had some good biblical and theological instincts".

Adventist statement of belief about the Spirit of Prophecy

White's writings are sometimes referred to as the Spirit of Prophecy by Adventists. The term is dually applied to the Holy Spirit which inspired her writings.

Early Sabbatarian Adventists, many of whom had come out of the Christian Connection, were anti-creedal. However, as early as 1872 Adventists produced a statement of Adventist beliefs. This list was refined during the 1890s and formally included in the SDA Yearbook in 1931 with 22 points. In 1980 a statement of 27 Fundamental Beliefs was adopted, to which one was added to in 2005 to make the current list of fundamental beliefs. White is referenced in the fundamental belief on spiritual gifts. This doctrinal statement says:

One of the gifts of the Holy Spirit is prophecy. This gift is an identifying mark of the remnant church and was manifested in the ministry of Ellen G. White. As the Lord's messenger, her writings are a continuing and authoritative source of truth which provide for the church comfort, guidance, instruction, and correction. They also make clear that the Bible is the standard by which all teaching and experience must be tested. (.)

Criticism 

Critics have voiced doubts as to the reliability of Ellen G. White as a prophetess and the authenticity of her visions.
Ronald L. Numbers, an American historian of science, criticized White for her views on health and masturbation. Numbers argues that she plagiarized vitalist writers (such as Horace Mann and Larkin B. Coles) for her arguments against masturbation. White's book Appeal to Mothers states that she did not copy her text from the health reform advocates and that she independently reached such conclusions. Numbers' criticism was acknowledged as significant by the staff of the White Estate, which sought to refute it in A Critique of the Book Prophetess of Health,  arguing that the similarities are due to supernatural inspiration influencing each of the authors.

Roger Coon wrote a lecture arguing that certain followers of the religion were engaging in "equal but opposite dangers" in their view of White. He described one group that overdeified her, and one group that "picks and chooses" from what teachings they follow of hers.

Critics have accused Ellen White of plagiarism. One such was Walter T. Rea, who argued against the "original" nature of her alleged revelations in his book The White Lie. In response, The White Estate released a document to refute claims presented in The White Lie.

An attorney who specializes in patent, trademark, and copyright cases, Vincent L. Ramik, undertook a study of Ellen G. White's writings during the early 1980s, and concluded that they were "conclusively unplagiaristic." When the plagiarism charge ignited a significant debate during the late 1970s and early 1980s, the Adventist General Conference commissioned a major study by Fred Veltman to examine the issue of White's literary dependence in writing on the life of Christ. The full 2,561-page report of the "'Life of Christ Research Project" is available online, along with an abridged edition. Veltman examined fifteen, randomly selected chapters of The Desire of Ages for evidence of literary dependence and concluded, "On an average we may say that 31.4 percent of the DA text is dependent to some extent on literary sources." Roger W. Coon, David J. Conklin, Denis Fortin, King and Morgan, among others, undertook the refutation of the accusations of plagiarism. At the conclusion of his report, Ramik states:

It is impossible to imagine that the intention of Ellen G. White, as reflected in her writings and the unquestionably prodigious efforts involved therein, was anything other than a sincerely motivated and unselfish effort to place the understandings of Biblical truths in a coherent form for all to see and comprehend. Most certainly, the nature and content of her writings had but one hope and intent, namely, the furthering of mankind's understanding of the word of God.  Considering all factors necessary in reaching a just conclusion on this issue, it is submitted that the writings of Ellen G. White were conclusively unplagiaristic.

Ramik cleared her of breaking the law of the land and time (copyright infringement/piracy). In 1911, more than 70 years before charges of plagiarism, White wrote in the introduction to The Great Controversy her reason for quoting, in some cases without giving due credit, certain historians whose "statements afford a ready and forcible presentation on the subject." That means that she acknowledged the charges of “uncredited paraphrasing,” a common literary practice of her time. Spectrum, a liberal Adventist publication, claims that, due to the plagiarism scandal, "at least the educated mainstream church" ("church" meaning SDA church) no longer buys into the claim of White's "verbal inspiration".

The clearest evidence that Ellen G. White and her publisher, The Review & Herald, were guilty of illegal copyright infringement was the lawsuit filed against them by Conybeare and Howson, a major publisher in the 19th century, which documented extensive plagiarism by Ellen G. White in her book, Sketches from the Life of Paul, taken from their book, Life and Epistles of the Apostle Paul, published in 1855.  Confronted with this evidence, the Seventh-day Adventists immediately ceased publishing Ellen G. White's book, and did not re-publish it until the Conybeare and Howson copyright had expired.

The evidence that this was no isolated incident is found in the fact that the public secular press accused Ellen G. White of extensive plagiarism, documenting that this was her general practice, and concluding that "Mrs. White is a plagiarist, a literary thief."

As interesting as this legal opinion and discussion of plagiarism may be, the real issue for White and Adventists is how her now generally-recognized practice of significant literary dependence affects her authority and inspiration.

See also

 Adventism
 Adventist Baptismal Vow
 Adventist Health Studies
 Conditional Immortality
 Criticism of the Seventh-day Adventist Church
 Ellen G. White bibliography
 Inspiration of Ellen G. White
 Seventh-day Adventist Church Pioneers
 Teachings of Ellen G. White
 Three Angels' Messages
 Prophecy in the Seventh-day Adventist Church

References

Further reading
 Aamodt, Terrie Dopp, Gary Land, and Ronald L. Numbers, eds. Ellen Harmon White: American Prophet (Oxford University Press, 2014) 365 pp. essays by independent scholars

External links

 Ellen G. White Estate, Inc.
 
 
 
 extensively researched genealogy

Writings online
 Ellen White's First Vision
 Major books (from the White Estate page)
 Old and new search engines for "The Complete Published Writings of Ellen G. White"
 Adventist Archives Contains many articles written by Ellen White

1827 births
1915 deaths
19th-century American women writers
19th-century apocalypticists
19th-century Christian mystics
20th-century apocalypticists
20th-century Christian mystics
American book publishers (people)
American Seventh-day Adventist missionaries
American vegetarianism activists
Angelic visionaries
Christian vegetarianism
Critics of the Catholic Church
 
 
Female Christian missionaries
Founders of new religious movements
Lay theologians
People excommunicated by Methodist churches
People from Battle Creek, Michigan
People from Gorham, Maine
People from St. Helena, California
People involved in plagiarism controversies
Prophets in Christianity
Protestant mystics
Protestant writers
Seventh-day Adventist missionaries in the United States
Seventh-day Adventist religious workers
Seventh-day Adventists from Michigan
Seventh-day Adventist theologians
Simple living advocates
Women mystics